Francis John Bennett Marks Hugo (March 5, 1870 – December 30, 1930) was a Canadian-American politician.

Biography
He was born on March 5, 1870, in Kingston, Ontario, Canada to Nicholas Trevanion Hugo and Mary Rendle Marks.

Hugo attended Queen's College (now Queen's University) at Kingston and held Bachelor of Arts and Bachelor of Laws degrees.  He also earned a law degree from Cornell University.

He married Florence Goodale on June 8, 1899, in Watertown, New York and their son was Francis Goodale Hugo.

He served as Mayor of Watertown, New York. He was a delegate to the 1912 Republican National Convention.

In 1912, he ran for Secretary of State of New York but was defeated by Democrat Mitchell May. He was Secretary of State of New York from 1915 to 1920, elected in 1914, 1916 and 1918. As Secretary of State, he signed the joint resolution of the Senate and Assembly submitting a women's suffrage ballot question.

In Watertown, Hugo practiced law with Nicholas Doxtater Yost, father of Charles Woodruff Yost.

In 1923, Hugo was appointed by National Non-Theatrical Motion Pictures, Inc. to screen non-commercial films, a function similar to that performed by Will H. Hays for commercial films.

He died on December 30, 1930, at his home at 789 West End Avenue in Manhattan, New York City.

References

External links
 Political Graveyard

People from Kingston, Ontario
Canadian emigrants to the United States
Queen's University at Kingston alumni
Cornell Law School alumni
Secretaries of State of New York (state)
Politicians from Watertown, New York
1870 births
1930 deaths
Mayors of places in New York (state)
New York (state) Republicans